OCCA can refer to:

Oklahoma Court of Criminal Appeals
Organized Crime Control Act
Orthodox Catholic Church of America